Yulia Yevgenyevna Galyamina (born 23 January 1973 in Timiryazevsky District, Moscow) is a Russian linguist and political activist. 

She is a member of the Yabloko political party and has been often arrested and jailed for the organization and high-profile participation in protests against Vladimir Putin. 

In 2018, together with anthropologist Nikita Petrov, Yulia Galyamina became active helping to raise funds for the treatment of Ket folk singer Alexander Kotusov (1955–2019) when he was terminally ill and stuck in Kellog, his isolated native village.

In December 2020, she received a suspended sentence of two years of corrective labor colony for repeated violations of the rules for conducting rallies and pickets (article 212.1 of the Russian Criminal Code).

In March 2022, Galyamina was detained and held in custody pending trial, charged with violating the law on public events by trying to organize a protest against Russia's invasion of Ukraine. On 5 March, she was sentenced to 30 days in jail.

See also
Opposition to Vladimir Putin in Russia

References

External links

1973 births
Living people
Linguists from Russia
Women linguists
Russian political activists
Russian prisoners and detainees
Yabloko politicians
Academic staff of the Higher School of Economics
Russian activists against the 2022 Russian invasion of Ukraine
People listed in Russia as media foreign agents